Ronahî TV is a Kurdish television channel focusing on Kurds around the world. The channel was launched in 2012 and broadcasts from EU countries and Syria. Its headquarters are in Qamishli.

Description 
It is the first Kurdish television channel from Kurds in Syria. It reports mostly in Kurdish, but as well in Arabic and English language.

The channel runs via the collective efforts of 250 volunteers and has its headquarters in Qamishli  and has teams reporting from Kobani and Afrin.

Eutelsat on 14 April 2017 expressed its intention “to remove” the ability for Ronahi TV to broadcast, on grounds that Ronahi TV has broadcast statements by members of the Kurdistan Communities Union (KCK) and the Kurdistan Workers' Party (PKK) who are considered being a terrorist organization. The EFJ alleges that Eutelsat is taking action due to pressure from the Turkish  Radio and Television Supreme Council (RTÜK), to remove them. It has a YouTube channel with 50'5000 proscribers.

Several Ronahi TV-employed journalists have died or been wounded in the Syrian Civil War, among them are:

 Mustefa Mihemed, who died from injuries related to a mine explosion on July 13, 2016
Kendal Cudi, who was injured in the same mine explosion as Mustefa
Zekeriya Şêxo, who was wounded in the Turkish military operation in Afrin

References

Kurdish-language television stations
Television channels and stations established in 2012